= Kurkunta =

- Village
- Location in Karnataka, India Kurkunta (India)
- Coordinates: 17.20°N 77.36°E
- Country: India
- State: Karnataka
- District: Gulbarga

Languages
  - Official: Kannada
- Time zone: UTC+5:30 (IST)
- Postal code: 585210

Kurkunta is a village in Gulbarga district's Sedam taluk, Karnataka India. A government run cement factory is located here: Cement Corporation of India (CCI).
